Shake Shake Go is a British indie folk band based in London, England. The band is composed of Poppy Jones, Kilian Saubusse and Virgile Rozand. The band started from playing their collection of pop folk anthems along the streets of Britain and touring across UK and Europe as well as sharing stages with James Blunt as a supporting act on the UK leg of his 2014 World Tour. They released their debut single "England Skies" in December 2014 and their self-titled debut EP on 9 March 2015. The band released their second album Homesick on 4 September 2018.

Discography

Albums

EPs
2015: Shake Shake Go
2018: Dinosaur

Singles

References

External links

British indie pop groups
Welsh pop music groups
Musical groups established in 2012
British folk music groups
2012 establishments in England